Anthony Jephson may refer to:

 Anthony Jephson (died 1755), MP for Mallow
 Anthony Jephson (died 1794), MP for Mallow